Portloman  is a townland in County Westmeath, Ireland.

Portloman is one of 8 townlands of the civil parish of Portloman in the barony of Corkaree in the Province of Leinster. The neighbouring townlands are: Wattstown to the north, Ballard to the south, Scurlockstown to the west and Monroe to the north–west. The eastern boundary of the townland is formed by the shoreline of Lough Owel and the small island of Carrickphilbin.

In the 1911 census of Ireland there were 5 houses and 17 inhabitants in the townland; 1 house was unoccupied.

References

External links
Map of Portloman at openstreetmap.org
Portloman at The IreAtlas Townland Data Base
Portloman at Townlands.ie
Portloman at the Placenames Database of Ireland

Townlands of County Westmeath